The following is the complete list of acting performances and screen appearances by American media personality Paris Hilton.

As an actress

As herself

Music videos

References

Screen appearances
Celebrity-related lists